Transmembrane protein 98 is a single-pass membrane protein that in humans is encoded by the TMEM98 gene. The function of this protein is currently unknown. TMEM98 is also known as UNQ536/PRO1079.

Gene 
This gene is found on the plus strand of chromosome 17 at locus 17q11.2. It spans from base pairs 31,254,928 to 31,272,124.

Variants 
There are two known transcript variants that encode for TMEM98. Variant one corresponds to the longer of the two, has 8 exons, and is 1808 bases in length. Variant two codes for the same protein, but is slightly shorter at exon 2 and is missing exon 3; it is 1732 bases long. This missing region corresponds to 85 base pairs near the end of the 5' UTR. Variant one is more abundant than Variant two with 17 times the amount mRNA extracted in various human tissue experiments.

Evolution

Paralogs 
There are no known paralogs for TMEM98. While not functional, there are two pseudogenes found on chromosome 6 and 14 in Homo sapiens.

Orthologs 
Transmembrane protein 98 is highly conserved in fish, amphibians, reptiles, birds, and other non-human mammals. It is only slightly conserved and invertebrates and insects and is not found in bacteria, archaea, protists, plants, or fungi.

Phylogeny 
The percent change over time graph was made using Time Tree.

Protein 
Transcript Variant one and two code for the same protein of 226 amino acids. The protein is 24.6 kdal with an isoelectric point of 4.26.

Domains 
There is no signal peptide in this protein. The transmembrane domain is 22 amino acids long and is located from amino acids 6-28. Amino acids on the N-terminus side are located outside of the cell, and amino acids on the C-terminius side are outside of the cell.

The paralogous domain Grap2 and cyclin-D-interacting (pfam13324) spans from 81-151 and is highly conserved in orthologs. This region is involved in the regulation of proliferation and cell differentiation using Grap2 and cyclin-d-mediated signaling pathways.

Secondary Structure 
TMEM98 is composed of 7 alpha helices as predicted by NCBI CBLAST with an e-value of 9x10−7.

Regulation

mRNA level 
The promoter region is 901 base pairs in length. The most highly conserved predicted transcription factors are shown below.

Possible Stem Loops
The 5' UTR has two possible stem loops. These are located from 279-303 and 342-372. In the 3' UTR, there is a possible stem loop located from 1487-1502.

microRNA Binding Sites
There is one miRNA binding site in the 3' UTR as predicted using TargetScan. This miRNA, hsa-miR-4782-3p, may play a role in breast cancer.

Protein level 
TMEM98 has 4 predicted glycation sites at amino acids 44, 118, 120, and 133. There are serine phosphorylation sites at 60, 122, 124, 136, 145, and 191 and threonine phosphorylation sites at 55, 105, and 160. These sites are all on the N-terminus side of the transmembrane region and are inside the cytosol of the cell.

Expression 
TMEM98 is expressed highly in retina, adipose tissue, embryo, ovary, umbilical cord, uterus, prostate, large and small intestines, lung, medical olfactory epithelium, nasal organ, stomach, bladder, and adrenal gland tissues. It is expressed very low in fertilized egg, oocyte, B cell, skeletal muscle, tongue epidermis, and thymus tissues.

It is also more highly expressed later embryonic stages.

Clinical aspects
Mutations in TMEM98 cause autosomal dominant nanophthalmos.

References